Salix discolor, the American pussy willow or glaucous willow, is a species of willow native to North America, one of two species commonly called pussy willow.

It is native to the vast reaches of Alaska as well as the northern forests and wetlands of Canada (British Columbia east to Newfoundland), and is also found in the northern portions of the contiguous United States (Idaho east to Maine, and south to Maryland).

The leaves are oval, 3–14 cm long and 1–3.5 cm broad, green above and downy grey-white beneath.

The flowers are soft silky silvery catkins, borne in early spring before the new leaves appear, with the male and female catkins on different plants (dioecious); the male catkins mature yellow at pollen release.

The fruit is a small capsule 7–12 mm long containing numerous minute seeds embedded in cottony down.

Cultivation and uses
Like other willows, it contains salicin, and was used by Native Americans as a painkiller.

As with the closely related Salix caprea (European pussy willow), it is also often grown for cut flowers. Pussy willow has further cultural information and other uses.

Ecology
Male flowers provide pollen for bees, and it is a popular larval host, supporting the Acadian hairstreak, black-waved flannel moth, cecropia moth, Compton's tortoiseshell, cynthia moth, dreamy duskywing, eastern tiger swallowtail, elm sphinx, imperial moth, Io moth, modest sphinx, mourning cloak, polyphemus moth, promethea moth, red-spotted purple, small-eyed sphinx, twin-spotted sphinx, and viceroy.

References

discolor
Trees of the Northeastern United States
Trees of the Southeastern United States
Trees of the Great Lakes region (North America)
Taxa named by Gotthilf Heinrich Ernst Muhlenberg
Flora without expected TNC conservation status